Luke Molyneux (born 29 March 1998) is an English professional footballer who plays as a winger for Doncaster Rovers.

Career

Sunderland
Molyneux came through the ranks with Sunderland and played his first professional games for the under-23 squad in the 2016–17 EFL Trophy. He later went on to make his first-team debut in a 3–0 victory over Wolverhampton Wanderers on 6 May 2018.

Loan to Gateshead
After a handful of substitute appearances early in the 2018–19 season, Molyneux went on a half-season loan to National League side Gateshead. Molyneux scored his first career goal in a 4–0 victory over Dunston UTS on 20 October 2018 in the fourth qualifying round of the FA Cup. He later went on to score his first league goals against Maidstone United on 22 December 2018, netting two goals in a 3–2 win. Molyneux made 18 appearances for Gateshead during his loan spell, scoring three goals.

Loan to Hartlepool United
Following his return to Sunderland, Molyneux went on a further loan to another local National League side Hartlepool United on 18 January 2019. Molyneux made 16 appearances for Hartlepool during his loan spell, scoring the winning goals in victories over Dover Athletic and FC Halifax Town.

Hartlepool United
Following his release by Sunderland, Molyneux signed permanently for Hartlepool permanently on 12 June 2019. Unfortunately for Molyneux, his first full season with the club was cut short after suffering an ankle injury during a pre-season friendly at York City. On 1 January 2020, Molyneux made his return from injury as a late substitute in a 1–0 defeat against Harrogate Town. On 8 February 2020, Molyneux made his first start of 2019–20 season as he scored and assisted in Hartlepool's 2–0 victory over Aldershot Town. 

In October 2020, Molyneux contracted COVID-19, forcing him to miss the opening fixtures of the 2020–21 season. In the 2021 National League play-off Final, Molyneux was a late substitute in extra time against Torquay United. In the resulting penalty shoot-out, he scored Hartlepool's fifth penalty as Hartlepool were promoted back to League Two.

On 20 July 2021, Molyneux signed a contract extension with Hartlepool. On 25 September 2021, Molyneux scored his first Football League goal in a 1–1 draw with Exeter City. On 25 January 2022, Molyneux scored the equaliser against Charlton Athletic three minutes after coming off the bench as Hartlepool progressed to the semi-finals of the EFL Trophy. He also scored in the resulting penalty shoot-out. This performance earned him player of the round for the quarter-finals.

Molyneux picked up three awards at Hartlepool's 2021–22 Awards ceremony. He won the Players' and Fans' Player of the Year Award, along with the Goal of the Season Award for his long range strike in a 2–1 win against Harrogate Town. On 21 June 2022, it was announced that Molyneux had turned down the offer of a new contract and would be leaving the club. He left for Doncaster Rovers.

Doncaster Rovers
On 21 June 2022, the same day as his impending departure from Hartlepool was announced, Molyneux agreed to join recently relegated League Two club Doncaster Rovers on a two-year deal. Molyneux later revealed that he had been in talks with League One sides Milton Keynes Dons and Bristol Rovers in the weeks prior to him joining Doncaster. In February 2023, Molyneux scored a brace in a 2–0 victory at Swindon Town, his first goals for the club.

Style of play
Molyneux has been described as a versatile performer who is comfortable on either flank or even in a more central position, and is known for his direct style, pace and trickery.

Career statistics

Honours
Hartlepool United
National League play-offs: 2021

Individual
Hartlepool United Players' Player of the Year: 2021–22
Hartlepool United Fans' Player of the Year: 2021–22

References

1998 births
Living people
Sportspeople from Bishop Auckland
Footballers from County Durham
English footballers
Association football midfielders
Sunderland A.F.C. players
Gateshead F.C. players
Hartlepool United F.C. players
Doncaster Rovers F.C. players
English Football League players
National League (English football) players